1100 Grand Concourse is a co-operative apartment building located in the Concourse neighborhood of the Bronx, New York City. It was built in 1928 and was originally called the John Ericsson Building; John Ericsson's name can still be found in several parts of the structure.  It has been considered by The New York Times as one of the most prominent residential buildings in the Bronx.

The building is part of the Grand Concourse Historic District.

Notable residents
 Lazarus Joseph (1891–1966), NY State Senator and New York City Comptroller.

Image gallery

References

Residential buildings in the Bronx
Residential buildings completed in 1928
National Register of Historic Places in the Bronx
Historic district contributing properties in New York City
Concourse, Bronx
Art Deco architecture in the Bronx